Cape May County is the southernmost county in the U.S. state of New Jersey. Much of the county is located on the Cape May peninsula, bound by the Delaware Bay to its west and the Atlantic Ocean to its south and east. Adjacent to the Atlantic coastline are five barrier islands that have been built up as seaside resorts. Tourism generates annual revenues of about $6.6 billion as of 2018, making it the county's single largest industry. The associated leisure and hospitality industries are Cape May's largest employers. Its county seat is the Cape May Court House section of Middle Township.

As of the 2020 census, the county was the state's second-least populous county, with a population of 95,263, a decrease of 2,002 (−2.1%) from the 2010 census count of 97,265, which in turn reflected a decline of 5,061 (-4.9%) from the 102,326 counted in the 2000 census. The county is part of the Ocean City, NJ metropolitan statistical area and the Philadelphia-Reading-Camden, PA-NJ-DE-MD combined statistical area, also known as the Delaware Valley.

Before the county was settled by Europeans, the Kechemeche tribe of the Lenape Native Americans inhabited South Jersey. Beginning in 1609, European explorers purchased land from, and contributed to the decline of, the indigenous people. The county was named for Cornelius Jacobsen Mey, a Dutch captain who explored and charted the area from 1620 to 1621, and established a claim for the province of New Netherland. In 1685, the court of Cape May County was split from neighboring Burlington County, although the boundaries were not set until seven years later. In 1690, Cape May (originally known as Cape Island) was founded, becoming America's oldest seaside resort. 

The county was subdivided into three townships in 1798: Lower, Middle, and Upper. The other 16 municipalities in the county, including two no longer in existence, were established between 1827 and 1928. In 1863, the first railroad in the county opened, which carried crops from the dominant farming industry. Railroads later led to the popularity of the county's coastal resorts. The need for improved automotive access to the county led to the development of the Garden State Parkway, which opened in 1956.

The county is part of the South Jersey region of the state.

History

Etymology

Before Cape May County was settled by Europeans, the indigenous Kechemeche tribe of the Lenape people inhabited South Jersey, and traveled to the barrier islands during the summer to hunt and fish.<ref name="Story">{{cite book|author=John P. Snyder|url=http://www.state.nj.us/dep/njgs/enviroed/oldpubs/bulletin67.pdf|title=The Story of New Jersey's Civil Boundaries: 1606-1968|publisher=Bureau of Geology and Topography|year=1969|location=Trenton, New Jersey|access-date=March 26, 2018|archive-date=June 5, 2012|archive-url=https://web.archive.org/web/20120605161833/http://www.state.nj.us/dep/njgs/enviroed/oldpubs/bulletin67.pdf|url-status=live}}</ref>A Brief History of Ocean City New Jersey , Ocean City, New Jersey. Accessed December 23, 2017. During the 17th century, the area that is now Cape May County was claimed as part of New Netherlands, New Sweden, the Province of New Jersey under the British crown, and later West Jersey. On August 28, 1609, English explorer Henry Hudson entered the Delaware Bay and stayed one day on land, north of what is now Cape May Point. As early as 1666, the southern tip of New Jersey was known as Cape Maey, named after Dutch explorer Cornelius Jacobsen May, who sailed the coastline of New Jersey from 1620 to 1621. In 1630, representatives of the Dutch West India Company purchased a  tract of land along the Delaware from indigenous people, and bought additional land 11 years later. Due to the large number of whales in the region of Cape May, Dutch explorers founded Town Bank around 1640 along the Delaware Bay as a whaling village. It was the first European settlement in what is now Cape May County, and was populated by descendants of Plymouth County.

History
In 1685, the court of Cape May was split from Burlington County, which at that time encompassed all or nearly all of South Jersey. In 1690, a settlement began at Cape Island (now Cape May). As whaling declined due to overpopulation, Town Bank diminished in importance in favor of Cape May, and was largely washed away by 1750. The limits of the county were adjusted over the next two centuries, mostly the portion near Maurice River Township. The first water mill in the county was constructed in 1699 in Cold Spring. Nearby, the First Baptist Church was built in 1712, and the first Cold Spring Presbyterian Church was built in 1718. Both churches, as well as nearby private homes, functioned as the center of early county government.

In 1744, the county chose Romney Marsh – later Cape May Court House – near the county's center to become the county seat. The first jail and courthouse were built in 1764. The county's population was around 1,000 in 1750, isolated from the rest of New Jersey by forests. Cape May grew independently as America's oldest bathing resort by 1765, leading to the city's current motto "The Nation's Oldest Seashore Resort". Amid the British blockade of the Delaware Bay in the American Revolutionary War, two British ships pursued and attacked the American brig Nancy, which fled to the coast at Turtle Gut Inlet (located in Wildwood Crest today). The Nancy was abandoned and sabotaged, killing at least 30 British sailors when the brig exploded after they boarded. The Battle of Turtle Gut Inlet on June 29, 1776, was the only Revolutionary War battle fought in the county.

Cape May County was split into three townships on February 21, 1798 – Lower, Middle, and Upper. The three townships were previously established as precincts on April 2, 1723. During the War of 1812, British forces raided farms in the county for food and fresh water. In retaliation, residents dug canals to the ocean, making the water no longer drinkable. In 1827, Dennis Township was created from portions of Upper Township, 101 years after its namesake Dennisville was founded in 1726. The oldest independent borough in the county was Cape Island Borough in 1848, which became the city of Cape May in 1869. Over the next 60 years as transport to the region improved, most of the current municipalities in the county were created. Sea Grove, later renamed Cape May Point, was founded in 1875. In 1879, Ocean City was founded as a religious retreat. Sea Isle City was founded in 1882, followed by West Cape May in 1884. In 1885, Anglesea (renamed North Wildwood in 1906) and Holly Beach (later a part of Wildwood) were founded. A land development company established Avalon in 1887. In 1891, Woodbine was founded on the mainland as an agriculture settlement for Russian Jews who fled religious persecution. From 1894 until 1945, South Cape May existed as an independent borough until it was largely destroyed by the 1944 Great Atlantic hurricane. In 1906, the eastern coastal boundary of Cape May County was established at a point 3 nautical miles (3.5 mi, 5.5 km) east of the coast. The last municipalities to be established were Wildwood Crest (in 1910), Stone Harbor (in 1914), and West Wildwood (in 1920). In 1928, North Cape May was founded, but was dissolved in 1945 after it failed to attract development following the Great Depression.

During World War II, Cape May Canal was built to connect the Delaware Bay and Cape May Harbor, completed in March 1943. The completion of the Garden State Parkway in 1955 brought hundreds of thousands of tourists, as well as a larger year-round population. Since the 1970s, the mainland has become more developed, due to the high cost of building on the barrier islands. Commercial development concentrated along U.S. Route 9 in Rio Grande, Cape May Court House, and Marmora. Concurrent with the 1980 Presidential election, Cape May County residents voted in favor to create a new state of South Jersey along with five other counties in a nonbinding referendum.

Geography and climate
The location near water provides milder temperatures than surrounding areas, as well as a continuous breeze, which contribute to the area's tourism-driven economy. Sea level along the coast is the lowest point.

Overall, the county is flat and coastal. Much of Cape May County lies on the Cape May Peninsula, which is part of the Atlantic coastal plain. There are also  of ponds, lakes, bays, and reservoirs. The islands have gently-sloped beaches and are largely built up. There were only barrier four islands from 1922, when Turtle Gut Inlet was filled in to create Wildwood Crest, until 1945, when Cape May Canal was constructed through the southern portion of the county.

Climate

Given its maritime influence and southernmost location within New Jersey, Cape May County has a more moderate climate than surrounding areas. During the summer, the county is often 3–5 degrees cooler, and 5–10 degrees warmer in the winter. Much of the county is in USDA plant hardiness zone 7a/7b, with a small portion in the county's southeastern extreme in zone 8a. The region typically gets  of snowfall each year, much less than the mountains of New Jersey. According to the Köppen climate classification system, Cape May County has a humid subtropical climate (Cfa). According to the Trewartha climate classification this climate is Do (oceanic.) The county has windy conditions throughout the year.

Owing to its location along the coast, Cape May County has experienced the effects of tropical cyclones for centuries. In Whale Beach on Ludlam Island, core samples suggested the passage of an intense hurricane sometime between 1278 and 1438. The next significant hurricane in the area was September 3, 1821. Around 1800 UTC (2:00 PM local time), the eye of the hurricane crossed over Cape May, estimated as a Category 4 on the Saffir–Simpson scale. It is estimated that an identical hurricane to the 1821 storm would cause over $1 billion in damage in Cape May County, and $107 billion in damage nationwide. The Gale of 1878 flooded Cape May County and produced  winds. During the passage of Hurricane Gloria in 1985, Ocean City recorded a wind gust of 101 mph (162 km/h). Hurricane Sandy struck the state on October 31, causing at least $150 million in damage in the county from its high winds and high tides.

Cape May County has experienced a variety of other weather effects. In March 1962, a stalled coastal storm produced several days of extremely high tides along the barrier islands, which damaged the boardwalks of Cape May, Avalon, and Sea Isle City. The 1991 Perfect Storm produced high tides and beach erosion. In January 2016, a blizzard nicknamed "Winter Storm Jonas" produced record high tides in the county, reaching  at the terminal for Cape May–Lewes Ferry, surpassing that of Hurricane Sandy. Nearly every municipality in the county reported damage, and in coastal towns, the beaches were severely eroded. Since 1997, three tornadoes have touched down in the county, all of them weak.

Flora and fauna

The uplands, wetlands, and open waters of the county support one of the largest concentration of migratory birds in North America. Nearly 900,000 migratory birds were observed in 1995 in Avalon. Along the Delaware Bay, 800,000 to 1.5 million birds pass through the area each spring. In 1947, the Stone Harbor Bird Sanctuary was established, which was designated as a National Natural Landmark in 1965. In addition to the 151 species of birds that frequent the county, there are two species of whales, the loggerhead sea turtle, the northern pine snake, two species of treefrog, and the tiger salamander that inhabit the waters of Cape May County. Eight species of fish and four species of shellfish populate the coastal waters.

About 30% of the county is covered by forests that runs the length of the Cape May peninsula and connects with the Pinelands. The largely unfragmented forest provides breeding grounds for the barred owl, red-shouldered hawk, and wood thrush, and also provides habitat for insects and migratory birds. In the county's swampy interior, there are over 20 species of trees and 40 species of shrubs. About 42% of the county consists of wetlands. The marshes between the mainland and the barrier island are dominated by the common reed, narrow-leaved cattail, bulrushes, and smooth cordgrass. Along the beach, the American beachgrass predominantly make up dune systems, along with other plant species.

The county utilizes five underground aquifers, including two that derive from the Kirkwood-Cohansey aquifer. Severe storms resulted in saltwater intrusion of the county's freshwater supply. The suitable growing conditions led to West Cape May considering itself the "lima bean capital of the world", until Guatemala surpassed it in the 1990s. The city still hosts an annual lima bean festival.

Geology
These metamorphic rocks include gneiss, quartzite, and schist. During the Paleozoic era, the region was part of a mountainous landmass that extended from the Arctic to Mexico. Erosion during the Triassic and Jurassic periods formed valleys that gathered sediment, which deposited and layered as the coastline receded and rose. In the Paleocene and Eocene epochs, as well as the later Miocene epoch, the area that is now Cape May County was under water. The coastline receded again during the Quaternary period.

During the Sangamonian interglacial period, melting glaciers formed rivers that carried sediment to the coast. The Bridgeton Formation deposited silt and clay through a fluvial process, while the later Cape May Formation deposited sand, silt, clay, and gravel. The Great Egg Harbor River in its formative stage produced a delta that covered much of what is now Cape May County with sediment. Around 14,000 years ago, glaciers began melting, and the barrier islands of Cape May County formed, likely from spits and lines of dunes.

Demographics

2020 census
As of the 2020 U.S. census, the county had 95,263 people, 40,939 households, and 26,792 families. The county's racial makeup was 85.6% White, 3.74% African American, 0.26% Native American, 0.95% Asian, and 5.95% from two or more races. Hispanic or Latino of any race were 7.83% of the population.

There were 40,939 households, of which 23.8% had children under the age of 18 living with them, 52.7% were married couples living together, 26.3% had a female householder with no husband present, 15.5% had a male householder with no wife present and 34.5% were non-families. 15.1% of all households were made up of individuals, and 15.8% had someone living alone who was 65 years of age or older. The average household size was 2.19 and the average family size was 2.70.

About 17.6% of the county's population was under age 18, 6.7% was from age 18 to 24, 29.2% was from age 15 to 44, and 27.0% was age 65 or older. The median age was 50.5 years. The gender makeup of the county was 48.4% male and 51.5% female. For every 100 females, there were 94.0 males.

The county's median household income was $69,980, and the median family income was $83,695. About 8.8% of the population were below the poverty line, including 14.2% of those under age 18 and 6.2% of those age 65 or over.

Cape May County is part of the Ocean City, NJ Metropolitan Statistical Area, as well as the Philadelphia-Reading-Camden, PA-NJ-DE-MD Combined Statistical Area.

2010 census

As of the 2010 census, there were 98,365 houses in the county, of which only 42% were occupied year round. There are 47 campgrounds with 17,999 campsites, greater than the number of campsites in all other counties in the state combined. There are also 18,700 hotel rooms in the county. The median household income of the county was $57,168 as of 2013, the fourth-lowest of New Jersey's 21 counties. About 10% of residents live below the federal poverty line. The county ranked last in the state in terms of residents with Assets Limited, Income Constrained, and Employed (ALICE), representing nearly one-third of the county's residents.

Government
County government
Cape May County is governed by a Board of County Commissioners consisting of five members elected at-large in partisan elections to serve three-year terms of office on a staggered basis, with either one or two seats up for vote as part of the November general election. At an annual reorganization meeting held in January, the board selects a director and deputy director from among its members. In 2016, commissioners were paid $17,973 and the director was paid an annual salary of $18,973. , Cape May County's commissioners are (with terms for director and vice director ending every December 31st):

Each county in New Jersey is required by the New Jersey State Constitution to have three elected administrative officials known as "constitutional officers." These officers are the County Clerk and County Surrogate (both elected for five-year terms of office) and the County Sheriff (elected for a three-year term). Cape May County's Constitutional Officers are:

The Cape May County Prosecutor is Jeffrey H. Sutherland, who was appointed to the position by Governor of New Jersey Chris Christie and sworn into office on December 21, 2017. Cape May County, along with Atlantic County, is part of Vicinage 1 of New Jersey Superior Court. Atlantic County has a civil courthouse in Atlantic City, while criminal cases are heard in Mays Landing; the Assignment Judge for Vicinage 1 is Julio L. Mendez.

Policing
The current county sheriff is Bob Nolan, elected in 2017 after working in the sheriff's office for 30 years, most recently as undersheriff. The first county sheriff was Benjamin Godfrey in 1692. Aside from maintaining law and order, the sheriff's responsibilities include the sale of property, overseeing the corrections facility, transporting of jurors, and collecting court-ordered judgments. The first county jail was built in 1705 in Middle Township, and the current jail was built in 1977. A new facility is scheduled to be completed in August 2018, at the cost of $37 million. In 2015, Cape May County had 3,332 criminal offenses, the fifth fewest of any county in New Jersey. This represented a crime rate of 35.1 offenses per 1,000 people, and a violent crime rate of 4.7 offenses per 1,000 people.

 Federal representatives 
The 2nd Congressional District covers all of Cape May County.Plan Components Report , New Jersey Department of State Division of Elections, December 23, 2011. Accessed October 3, 2013. 

 State representatives 
The county lies entirely within the 1st Legislative District.

 Politics 
Though New Jersey is generally Democratic in recent state-wide elections, Cape May County is a mostly Republican county, with the highest percentage of voters registered as Republicans of any county in the state. As of October 1, 2021, there were a total of 74,585 registered voters in Cape May County, of whom 31,859 (42.7%) were registered as Republicans18,498 (24.8%) were registered as Democrats and 23,325 (31.3%) were registered as unaffiliated. There were 903 voters (1.2%) registered to other parties. Among the county's 2010 Census population, 69.9% were registered to vote, including 81.1% of those ages 18 and over.GCT-P7: Selected Age Groups: 2010 - State -- County / County Equivalent from the 2010 Census Summary File 1 for New Jersey, United States Census Bureau. Accessed May 11, 2015.

In the 2008 and 2012 United States presidential elections, Republicans carried the county by an 8.6% margin over Barack Obama. However, in 2016 and 2020, Republican Donald Trump won the county by more than 15 points. Despite the county's strong Republican lean, at least one Democrat has won the county in recent years. In 2018, Democrat Jeff Van Drew outpolled Republican Seth Grossman in the county by a margin of 21,595 (52.6%) to 19,003 (46.3%) in that year's congressional election. Although, Van Drew changed his partisan affiliation in 2019 and won the county as a Republican over Democratic challenger Amy Kennedy by a margin of 34,627 (60.7%) to 21,899 (38.4%).

|}

In the 2009 gubernatorial election, Republican Chris Christie received 54.34% of the vote (18,992 votes) to Democratic Governor Jon Corzine's 38.28% of the vote (13,379 votes), while Independent Chris Daggett won 6.08%	(2,126 votes). In the 2013 gubernatorial election, Republican Chris Christie received 23,531 votes in the county (71.6%), ahead of Democrat Barbara Buono with 8,798 votes (26.7%). In the 2017 gubernatorial election, Republican Kim Guadagno received 16,118 (53.2%) of the vote, and Democrat Phil Murphy received 13,566 (44.8%) of the vote. In the 2021 gubernatorial election, Republican Jack Ciattarelli received 62.8% of the vote (24,260 ballots cast) to Democrat Phil Murphy's 36.7% (14,183 votes).

Economy
The primary job sectors in Cape May County are related to hotel accommodation, food service, retail, health care/aide, arts/entertainment, and construction. Historically, Cape May County's economy was driven by whaling and farming, until seasonal resorts were built in the 19th century. These industries remain a part of the county's job sector, along with agritourism, and around 30,000 people in the private industry. The largest employer is Morey's Piers, which hires 1,500 people. Cape Regional Medical Center hires over 1,000 people. More than 10,000 people are in the hospitality sector. As of February 2018, the unemployment rate in Cape May County was 14.3%, significantly more than the 5.2% unemployment rate in August 2017. Each year, the unemployment rate peaks in the wintertime and drops in the summertime, reflective of the county's dependence on seasonal tourism-driven jobs. As of February 2018, Cape May County had the highest unemployment rate in New Jersey, followed by neighboring Atlantic and Cumberland counties.

Based on data from the Bureau of Economic Analysis, Cape May County had a gross domestic product (GDP) of $4.9 billion in 2018, which was ranked 19th in the state and represented an increase of 2.0% from the previous year.

As of 2018, the tourism industry generated about $6.6 billion worth of income in Cape May County, representing 43% of county employment. Retail, food, and beverage represented $2.6 billion, while camping and lodging represented about $2.4 billion in expenditures. Recreational activities generated $708 million in expenditures. Eco-tourism generated $670 million, and transportation costs were $390 million. There is little heavy industry in the county due to environmental concerns.

Tourism

The majority of Cape May County's industry is tourism, due to its beaches and location between the Delaware Bay and the Atlantic Ocean.  During the summer season (which traditionally ranges from Memorial Day to Labor Day), tourists often outnumber locals 9 to 1. As of 2010, the four largest markets for tourism in Cape May County were Greater Philadelphia, North Jersey, New York, and the Canadian province of Québec.

In addition to sales tax, hotel occupancy tax and other assessments charged throughout the state, tourism-related business in North Wildwood, Wildwood and Wildwood Crest, such as hotels and restaurants, are required to collect an additional 2% tourism sales tax that is used to cover costs for promoting tourism.

Canadian tourists typically visit Cape May County over the summer. In 1991, Canadian tourism into Cape May County remained strong despite an economic recession occurring in Canada. As of 1993, most Canadian tourists to the county were Francophones, who typically began their visits during the final two weeks of the month of July, when many Canadians working in the construction and garment sectors receive two-week paid time off. Most of the French Canadian tourists who visit Cape May County stay in hotels in The Wildwoods or campgrounds on the mainland. In the 1990s, Cape May County established its first international tourism office in Montréal, along St. Catherine's Street,Gilfillian, Trudi. "Canadians invade, to county's delight / Cape May County enjoys influx of tourists" , The Press of Atlantic City, August 18, 2009. Accessed August 20, 2013. but closed it around 1995, due to budget cuts. By 2010 the tourism office of Cape May County established a French language coupon booklet. In 2010, Cape May County tourism director estimated that 13% of visitors to the region originated from Quebec.

Beach tags are required for beach access in some of the most popular beaches and are collected under the terms of a 1955 state law that allows oceanfront municipalities to charge "reasonable fees" for providing safety and maintenance at the beaches. The highest seasonal beach tag fee in the county was $35. The sale of daily, weekly and seasonal tags is a major source of revenue for the communities, with the six beachfront communities in Cape May County that charge for beach tags generating $10 million in revenue in 2016. Ocean City brought in $4.1 million in revenue in the 2016 season, the most of any municipality in the state. In the 2017 budget, the projected $4.1 million in fees for beach tag and $3 million for parking were two of Ocean City's biggest revenue sources, accounting for almost 9% of the city's annual budget of almost $80 million. Cape May City, with revenue of $2.2 million, was ranked third in the state. Four of the five municipalities in the state with guarded oceanfront beaches available with free public access are in the county, including Strathmere in Upper Township and the Wildwoods communities of North Wildwood, Wildwood and Wildwood Crest.

Beginning in 1968 the county government began campaigns to attract tourists from Canada. In 1970 it established a tourism office in Montreal and later made strides to get tourists from other parts of Quebec. The county government made efforts to train tourism establishments on how to receive French-speaking Canadian tourists.

Fishing and farming

Fishing has been an important industry in Cape May County since at least the 17th century, when the county's first European settlement was founded as a whaling village. In 1693, whaling proved such a successful industry that colonial Governor Andrew Hamilton instituted a 10% tax on whale products. By the mid-1700s, overfishing had diminished the whale population in the region. In the early 1800s, shipbuilding was an important industry, which declined by the 1850s. Fishing remains an important aspect of Cape May County's economy. In 2016, the combined port of Cape May and Wildwood ranked the ninth largest commercial fishing port in the United States as measured by monetary value, as well as the second largest on the east coast, only after New Bedford. Fishermen brought in 47 million lbs (21 million kg) of seafood, mainly scallops, worth $85 million (2016 USD). This was up from $73.7 million in 2009, when the overall market value of the port was estimated at $442 million, making it the fourth most valuable port in the country. In the 1980s, the scallop industry was worth only $15 million in the state of New Jersey. In 1990, laws limiting the catch and area of scallops led to a healthier and steadier population to harvest, which allowed for growth in the industry. Cold Spring Fish and Supply Company provides 500 jobs and is the county's third-largest employer.

The industry's popularity led to the first freight railroad in 1863, and continued to be a fixture of the county's economy until the 1960s.
There is an annual lima bean festival in West Cape May featuring foods made with the locally grown lima beans.

Education
There are 16 school districts operating schools, two of them countywide, and three non-operating school districts.

School districts include:Search for Public School Districts in Cape May County, New Jersey, National Center for Education Statistics. Accessed August 1, 2022.2020 Census School District Reference List for Cape May County, NJ, United States Census Bureau. Accessed August 22, 2022. The Census Bureau does not indicate countywide districts, and includes non-operating ones.

K-12
 Cape May County Special Services School District (countywide for special education)
 Middle Township Public Schools
 Ocean City School District
 Wildwood City School District

Secondary
 Cape May County Technical School District (countywide)
 Lower Cape May Regional School District

 Elementary (K-8, except as noted)

 Avalon School District
 Cape May City School District (K-6)
 Dennis Township Public Schools
 Lower Township School District (K-6)
 North Wildwood School District
 Stone Harbor School District
 Upper Township School District
 West Cape May School District (K-6)
 Woodbine School District
 Wildwood Crest School District

 Non-operating
 Cape May Point School District (non-operating since 1931)
 Sea Isle City School District (non-operating since 2012)
 West Wildwood School District

There are 25 public elementary and/or middle schools in Cape May County, including two in Avalon and Stone Harbor (which since 2011 agree to share each other's schools), one in Cape May, two in Dennis Township, five in Lower Township, three in Middle Township, one in North Wildwood, two in Ocean City, three in Upper Township, one in West Cape May, three in Wildwood, one in Wildwood Crest, and one in Woodbine. The following public high schools are in the county: Cape May County Technical High School, Lower Cape May Regional High School, Middle Township High School,  Ocean City High School, and Wildwood High School. There are also eight private schools in the county, including Wildwood Catholic Academy.

As of 2013, 31% of county residents had at least bachelor's degree, and 89.7% had at least a high school diploma. In 1973, Atlantic Community College began offering night classes at Middle Township High School. In 1999, the college name was formally changed to Atlantic Cape Community College'', and a full service campus was opened in 2005 in Cape May Court House. The community college has partnerships with Fairleigh Dickinson University, Rutgers University, and Stockton University.

The Cape May County Library has locations in Cape May, Cape May Court House, Lower Township, Stone Harbor, Sea Isle, Upper Township, Wildwood Crest, and Woodbine, as well as a bookmobile. Ocean City also has its own independent library.

Services
Cape Regional Medical Center opened as Burdette Tomlin Memorial Hospital in 1950, keeping that name until 2007. It is the only hospital in the county. The facility has expanded over time since its foundation, and now has 242 beds, with a staff of 1,060 people, to service the population and tourists in the county. AtlantiCare opened two urgent care centers in the county since the 1990s. From 2010 to 2015, opioid prescriptions rose 11%, in terms of the amount of morphine milligram equivalents (MME) per person. This rise was among the top 20% of counties nationally, and the second-highest in New Jersey. In the period from 2011 to 2015, health conditions in the county deteriorated, falling to 19th in a survey of New Jersey's 21 counties for child well-being; only neighboring Cumberland and Atlantic counties were worse. The county mortality rate was 13.7%, the highest in the state, which is largely due to the county's large elderly population.

Beesley's Point Generating Station is a coal-based power plant located in Upper Township that generates 447 megawatts of power each year. The coal plant releases among the most emissions of any New Jersey station, and as 2017 was the only coal generating station in the state. The plant's fuel source was scheduled to be changed to natural gas, pending the construction of the Atlantic Reliability Link through the Pinelands National Reserve. In 2017, the Pinelands Commission approved the proposed  pipeline, which would be built under area roads. In response, the New Jersey Sierra Club and the Pinelands Preservation Alliance sued to stop the construction. The prospective wind turbines there are capable of generating 3,500 MW of electricity.

Municipalities
The 16 municipalities in Cape May County (with 2010 Census data for population, housing units and area; along with communities within each municipalities for which census-designated places are noted with their population) are:

Recreation
The Cape May County Zoo is in Cape May Courthouse.

The nearest YMCA is the Cumberland Cape Atlantic YMCA in Vineland.

Parks and recreation

As of 2015, 49% of the lands in Cape May County were preserved open space. On November 9, 1989, the voters of Cape May County approved the Open Space Preservation Tax, which generates $4.9 million each year. Since then, the program spent $65 million to preserve open space, farmlands, and historic sites.

Corson's Inlet State Park was established in 1969 near the southern end of Ocean City to protect and preserve one of the last undeveloped areas of land along the New Jersey coastline. Cape May Point State Park was established at the southern end of the county in 1974, having been previously used as a military base until the Ash Wednesday Storm of 1962 damaged the facility. There are 10 wildlife management areas in the county, including Peaslee, which extends into neighboring Cumberland County, and Tuckahoe/MacNamara, which extends into neighboring Atlantic County.

In 1942, a  area of wooded land was donated to the county, which housed the 4-H fair. In November 1962, county residents approved a referendum to create a park commission, which was established in 1967 to maintain the county's parks. In 1978, the Cape May County Park & Zoo was created within Park Central, which houses 250 species of animals. Nearby Cape May County Park East has basketball and tennis courts. Park North is the Richard M. Cameron Wildlife Sanctuary, located in Palermo. The  undeveloped Great Sound State Park is in Middle Township.

In 1978, the New Jersey Pinelands National Reserve became the first National Reserve in the United States, a  region of South Jersey that spans seven counties, including Cape May. The act, and additional legislation from the New Jersey legislature, created the Pinelands Commission, which manages the growth in the Pine Barrens, and coordinates federal, state, and local governments. Each county appoints a commissioner, and since January 2018, Woodbine mayor William Pikolycky has represented the county. From 1988 until 2011, the National Park Service operated the New Jersey Coastal Heritage Trail Route, which promoted awareness and protection of nearly 300 mi (480 km) of New Jersey coastline. In 1989, the Cape May National Wildlife Refuge was established from lands purchased by the Nature Conservancy, and has grown in size since its establishment.

Breweries, distilleries, and wineries
Cape May Brewing Company opened in 2011 at the Cape May Airport, and by 2015 was the third-largest brewer in New Jersey. Tuckahoe Brewing also opened in 2011 in Ocean View, but moved to a bigger facility in Egg Harbor Township in neighboring Atlantic County in 2015. In 2015, Slack Tide Brew opened in Clermont. In 2016, Ludlam Island Brewery opened in the former location of Tuckahoe Brewing, after originally seeking to open the facility in Sea Isle City. Also in 2016, Cold Spring Brewing began operations out of a barn from 1804, as part of Historic Cold Spring Village, and 7 Mile Brewery opened in Cape May Court House. In 2017, Avalon Brew Pub opened in Avalon, and Bucket Brigade Brewery opened in Cape May Court House. Mudhen Brewery opened in Wildwood in April 2018. Gusto Brewery opened in December 2018 in North Cape May.

The first distillery to open in the county since the prohibition era was Lazy Eye Distillery, which opened a second facility in Wildwood in 2015 after opening its first facility in Atlantic County in 2014. In the same year, Cape May Distillery opened in Green Creek. In 2017, Nauti Spirits opened in Cape May on a  farm.

In 2007, the New Jersey Department of Agriculture designated Atlantic, Cape May, Cumberland, and Ocean counties as the Outer Coastal Plain American Viticultural Area (AVA) in 2007, recognizing the area as well-suited for grape growing. In late 2014, local wineries sought for a distinct Cape May Peninsula AVA. As of 2015, there were six wineries in the county. Cape May Winery & Vineyard opened in 1995 in North Cape May as the first commercial winery in the county. Turdo Vineyards & Winery opened to the public in North Cape May in 2004. Natali Vineyards opened in 2007 in the Goshen section of Middle Township. In 2009, Hawk Haven Vineyard & Winery opened to the public in the Rio Grande section of Lower Township. In 2012, Jessie Creek Winery opened in Cape May Court House, and in the same year, Willow Creek Winery opened in West Cape May.

Transportation
The indigenous population left behind a series of trails across Cape May County by the late 17th century. In 1695, John Somers operated the first ferry service across the Great Egg Harbor Bay to Beesley's Point in Cape May County. Beginning in 1697 and completed in 1707, the residents of Cape May County financed the construction of a road running from Cape May to the ferry in Beesley's Point, and onward to Burlington. Roads were built across the county to connect with the court house, but in low-lying areas these routes were corduroy roads, built from a series of logs. Local businessmen built the Dennis Creek Causeway in 1803, which eventually became NJ 47, which contributed to the growth of towns along the Delaware Bay, although people traveled to the county more often by steamboat.

In August 1863, the Cape May and Millville Railroad opened, connecting the county more quickly to points to the northwest. The railroad shipped freight from the county's many farms, and brought more people to the area, contributing to the development of coastal resorts. Travelers often brought their lunch in shoe boxes, leading to their nickname "shoobies". By 1892, much of the county was accessible by railroad, including all of the barrier islands. A second rail line was added in 1893 that connected Cape May to a branch of the rail line that ran from Atlantic City to Camden. By the 1890s, bicycling became common throughout the county, and bikeriders successfully lobbied the county to build better roads. Between 1900 and 1915, the county government built over 100 miles of gravel roads, a fact promoted in a county promotional brochure, but also the cause of controversies. County engineer N. C. Price was dismissed in 1903 due to accusations of poor building materials and inflated costs, and in 1921, two freeholders were jailed for defrauding the county, resulting in a smaller board of freeholders.

In 1916, the New Jersey legislature created the state highway system, taking responsibility for the maintenance and building of major roads. In 1917, the road between Cape May and Seaville became Route 14, which was renumbered Route 4 in 1927, and later U.S. 9 by the 1940s. The road ran the length of the state, and connected Cape May County with Atlantic County via the Beesley's Point Bridge built in 1928. From 1934 to 1946, the Cape May County Bridge Commission issued bonds and secured funding for five toll bridges to connect the barrier islands with each other. By the 1950s, state routes 47, 49, 50, 52, and 83 were established, connecting various municipalities.

In 1956, the Great Egg Harbor Bridge opened, connecting the county with Atlantic County and points north and west via the Garden State Parkway. A parallel bridge carrying northbound traffic of the Garden State Parkway opened in 1973. The road brings hundreds of thousands of people to the county during the summertime. The parkway passes through the length of the county, and has its southern terminus, known as Exit Zero, in Lower Township, connecting with U.S. Route 9. Further transportation connections were made after the Cape May–Lewes Ferry began operation in 1964, which can carry up to 100 cars and 800 people on its fleet of five boats. In 1971, Route 147 replaced county routes for the roadway from North Wildwood to U.S. 9, and in the same year, Route 162 was established for a new bridge over the Cape May Canal. In 1972, U.S. 9 was relocated from its southern terminus in Cape May to the ferry; the former route was redesignated Route 109. Route 347 was designated in the 1990s as an alternate route to Route 47.

There are 23 bridges owned by the county, including a series of causeways and bridges connecting the five barrier islands to the mainland.

There is limited public transportation within the county. The ensuing traffic congestion during summer months causes roadway congestion. NJ Transit buses operate the following lines in and out of the county: 313, 315, 316, 319, 507, 509, 510, and 552. The Great American Trolley Company operates private trolleys in Cape May, the Wildwoods, and Ocean City. The county also has a Fare Free Transportation system for limited populations. There are three airports in the county. The oldest is Ocean City Municipal Airport, opened in 1937. Woodbine Municipal Airport opened in 1945.

In 2009, the Ocean City metropolitan statistical area (MSA) ranked as the sixth highest in the United States for percentage of commuters who walked to work (8.4%).

See also

 National Register of Historic Places listings in Cape May County, New Jersey
 South Seaville Camp Meeting

References

External links

 Official county website
 The Cape May County Gazette newspaper
 The Beachcomber
 Cape May County Herald newspaper
 Rutgers at Atlantic Cape Community College

 
1685 establishments in New Jersey
Geography of the Pine Barrens (New Jersey)
Jersey Shore
Populated places established in 1685
South Jersey